Edvin Laine (13 July 1905 – 18 November 1989) was a Finnish film director. Laine was born Bovellán.

Laine directed a comedy Aaltoska orkaniseeraa and family film Sleeping Beauty, both in 1949.

The Unknown Soldier, a film Laine directed in 1955 based on Väinö Linna's novel, was a big sensation in Finland. There have later been two other film adaptations of the same novel but Laine's version remains the best known. Laine also directed another film based on Väinö Linna's book, Here, Beneath the North Star (1968), which also was a successful movie in Finland.

His 1958 film Sven Tuuva the Hero was entered into the 9th Berlin International Film Festival. Three years later, his film Skandaali tyttökoulussa was entered into the 2nd Moscow International Film Festival. Here, Beneath the North Star was entered into the 6th Moscow International Film Festival. His 1970 film Aksel and Elina was entered into the 7th Moscow International Film Festival.

Laine was married to the actress Mirjam Novero. He is buried in the Hietaniemi Cemetery in Helsinki.

References

1905 births
1989 deaths
People from Iisalmi
People from Kuopio Province (Grand Duchy of Finland)
Finnish film directors
Burials at Hietaniemi Cemetery